Myristica sarcantha is a species of plant in the family Myristicaceae. It is endemic to West Papua (Indonesia).

References

sarcantha
Flora of Western New Guinea
Vulnerable plants
Taxonomy articles created by Polbot